Sarah Lauritzen (born 27 February 1976 in Copenhagen) is a Danish rower.

External links 
 
 

1976 births
Living people
Danish female rowers
Rowers from Copenhagen
Olympic rowers of Denmark
Rowers at the 1996 Summer Olympics
Rowers at the 2000 Summer Olympics
Rowers at the 2004 Summer Olympics
World Rowing Championships medalists for Denmark